This is a list of metal bands from Taiwan.

A
Anthelion (Symphonic Black Metal) 幻日

C
ChthoniC (Death/Symphonic Black/Folk Metal) 閃靈樂團

E
Elephant Gym (Math Rock) 大象體操

F
Fire EX. (Punk Rock) 滅火器

N
No Party for Cao Dong (Indie Rock) 草東沒有派對

S
Seraphim (Melodic/Power Metal) 六翼天使樂團

External links
 Taipei Metal "News about Taiwan's Growing Metal Scene"
 Gig Guide Taiwan: A Directory of Live Shows and reviews of metal music in Taiwan
  Encyclopaedia Metallum - The Metal Archives' directory of metal bands in Taiwan
A clickable directory of metal bands in Taiwan, click band logos to be taken to band webpages
UnitAsia.org: search results for "Taiwan"